The HGSA Oration was established in 1990 in order to honour a pre-eminent member of the Human Genetics Society of Australasia (HGSA). It is a lecture given by a senior member of the HGSA who has contributed significantly to the profession over many years. The oration is given annually at the Annual Scientific Meeting of the HGSA.

References 

Genetics
Genetics organizations
Organizations established in 1977